Nicholas Marcell Speed (born August 12, 1980) is an American rapper, record producer, and disc jockey from Detroit, Michigan, United States. He has produced tracks for 50 Cent, Mopreme Shakur, Lloyd Banks, M.O.P., Talib Kweli, Phat Kat, Musiq Soulchild, Bishop Lamont, Danny Brown and many more.

Career
During the late 1990s, Nick Speed formed a hip-hop crew called 9-2-5 Colony with classmates Magestik Legend and iLLite, both of whom would go on to become part of the Subterraneous Records stable of artists.

While still in high school, Speed and Magestik spent a significant amount of time with DJ House Shoes, who assisted them with their first production experiments while also introducing them to other like-minded artists in the Detroit hip-hop community. Among these artists were Elzhi, who was then part of the Breakfast Club, and One Be Lo, who was part of Binary Star.

Speed and Magestik Legend invited Elzhi to become a part of the 925 Colony in 1999, shortly after Elzhi had completed recording his unreleased EP, Out of Focus. The new trio recorded only a few songs, none of which were released. Among these are "Farewell," produced by Lacks, "Oh Shit," and "Gun Talk."

With Magestik Legend's growing involvement with the Subterraneous crew, and Elzhi's affiliation with Waajeed and Slum Village, the 9-2-5 Crew found little time to write, record or perform music. Nick Speed became a freelance producer for many underground artists. Among the projects Speed worked on during this era was the unreleased record Inside Out by iLLite. This fruitful collaboration inspired the pair to work on a separate, full-length project, dubbing themselves the "People Movers".

G-Unit and Libido Sounds
Towards the end of 2004, friends and longtime collaborators Nick Speed and Elzhi teamed up to release Witness My Growth, a double-CD mixtape chronicling Elzhi's long, secretive history as a solo artist. To facilitate the release of this long-gestating project, the two created "Libido Sounds," an independent imprint dedicated to releasing quality hip-hop music.

A collection of Speed's beats found its way to the hands of Sha Money XL, who offered Nick an in-house production contract and management deal. Through this deal, Nick has produced tracks for many of today's most popular and influential emcees. He worked with Lloyd Banks the most during his time at g-unit and recurrently produced on "Cold Corner 2" 

Lloyd Banks also contacted Nick for his third studio album "The Hunger For More 2" where he produced "Home Sweet Home. Nick has been quoted as saying he has produced at least 10 records for Lloyd Banks alone. Some are on albums some are on mixtapes".

In August 2007, Nick Speed released the D-Tour Mixtape which showcases his versatility as a producer as well as an emcee. The double CD features many of Speed's collaborations with mainstream stars like 50 Cent and Lloyd Banks, but also displays the talents of other Detroit artists such as 87 and Fes Roc.

During his time at G-Unit Nick developed a relationship with Dr. Dre protege at the time Bishop Lamont and despite both parties no longer being associated with G-Unit/Aftermath they recently collaborated on a record called "Don't Stop" featuring Mopreme Shakur

Nick Speed & Seven the General
Nick & Seven the General first worked together as a writer/producer team in 2010 on K'Jon Present's Nick Speed & the Detroit Connect. Later that year "Seven the General" was named one of 11 "Hottest Local Talent" by WJLB for his Nick Speed produced "I Get It In" feat. K'Jon released on Seven's "the Sanctum Sanctorum" LP.

In early 2013 Nick Speed produced "A.R.T the DIA project" for Detroit emcee Seven the General. The album would go on to be nominated for a Detroit Music Award "Outstanding Electronic/Dance Recording" based on the track "Knowhere". Entirely produced by Nick Speed "A.R.T. the DIA project" also features the songs "Show Up" & "Detroit City Blues" by Seven the General featuring Guilty Simpson & Bizarre that became the official promotional anthem for "The Detroit Design Festival" held annually in Detroit. Seven the General would go on to win the Detroit Music Award for "Outstanding Rap Recording" in 2016

In August 2014 Seven the General & Nick Speed released "A.R.T. the DIA project" Documentary. The 23 minute film documents the creation of A.R.T. the DIA project (Seven the General's 4th solo LP) and gives an in-depth look into the producer and songwriters musical partnership and dedication to Detroit and Hip-Hop as a genre.

The Detroit Underground hip-hop awards in 2015 presented the two with "Best Full Length Project" for the "A.R.T. the DIA project" LP. Subsequently, In October 2016 Nick Speed & Seven the General were added to the Detroit Institute of Arts permanent archive. The museum purchased the photograph shot by Jenny Risher as representation of the Detroit Hip Hop as art which was the goal set by Seven & Nick

Discography

Studio albums
 The Beat Down (2013, Vinyl only)
   D-Cyphered      (2017)

Production 
50 Cent - "What If"
Lloyd Banks - "Anotha Dolla", "Stranger", "Home Sweet Home" (featuring Pusha T), "Cold Corner 2 (Eyes Wide)", "Victims Of Society", "Everywhere You Go", "A Lil Bit Colder", "Love Shots"
Proof - "Biboa's Theme"
Talib Kweli - "NY Weather Report", "Tater Tot"
Phat Kat - "Vessels" (featuring Truth Hurts)
Danny Brown - "Detroit 187" and almost all of Hot Soup.
Bishop Lamont - "Don't Stop" (featuring Mopreme Shakur)
Bizarre - Rock Out
Rapper Big Pooh - Dusty
Eminem - What You Gonna Do (featuring Dr. Dre & Obie Trice)
Obie Trice - "Gangster", "Dope"
 Seven The General - "A.R.T. the DIA project" LP (2012)
The Regiment - "Live From The Coney Island (2014)"

Vocals 
Elzhi - "We'll Get By"
J Dilla - "Dillatroit" 
Danny Brown - "She Love It"

Mixing, writing and arrangements 
J Dilla - "Rebirth Of Detroit" 
Talib Kweli - "Tater Tot"
Lloyd Banks - "Home Sweet Home" (featuring Pusha T), "Stranger"
Proof - "Searching for Jerry Garcia"
50 Cent - "What If"

Features
J Dilla - Rebirth of Hip-Hop
Danny Brown - Hot Soup
50 Cent - Get Rich or Die Tryin (Official Sound Track)
Lloyd Banks - The Big Withdrawal, Rotten Apple, The Hunger For More 2, The Cold Corner 2
Eminem - "Recovery" (Mixtape)

References

External links

American hip hop record producers
G-Unit Records artists
Living people
Musicians from Detroit
1980 births
American audio engineers
Midwest hip hop musicians
American hip hop DJs